Clystea serrana is a moth of the subfamily Arctiinae. It was described by Schaus in 1928. It is found in Brazil.

References

Clystea
Moths described in 1928